Sophie Thévenoux (née Solamito) (born 19 May 1957) is a Monegasque politician and diplomat.

Thevenoux was named to the Council of Government in 2009, taking up her position as Counsellor of Finance and Economy on March 26 of that year; she became the first woman to be named to a ministerial post in the government of Monaco. She presided over the ministry during a difficult period, during which revenue declined a considerable amount due to a variety of factors. She had previously served as director general of the Department of Finance and Economy, to which position she had been named in 2005. Thevenoux remained in charge of the ministry until 2011, when she was replaced by Marco Piccinini; Marie-Pierre Gramaglia entered the cabinet at the same time, becoming the second woman in Monaco's history to be appointed to such a position. In 2015 she was named Head of the Principality of Monaco's Mission to the European Union and the European Atomic Energy Community, presenting her credentials to Donald Tusk on May 7; at the same time she became Monaco's ambassador to Belgium, Luxembourg and the Netherlands, as well as Permanent Representative to the Organisation for the Prohibition of Chemical Weapons. She previously served as Monaco's ambassador to France. In 2016 she was named a Grand Officier of the Ordre National du Mérite in a ceremony in Brussels. She is married.

References

1957 births
Living people
Finance ministers of Monaco
Female finance ministers
Women government ministers of Monaco
Ambassadors of Monaco to Belgium
Ambassadors of Monaco to France
Ambassadors of Monaco to Luxembourg
Ambassadors of Monaco to the Netherlands
Ambassadors of Monaco to the European Union
Permanent Representatives of Monaco to the Organisation for the Prohibition of Chemical Weapons
Monegasque women ambassadors
21st-century women politicians
21st-century diplomats
Monegasque women diplomats